Polyipnus elongatus is a species of ray-finned fish in the family Sternoptychidae.

Status
Polyipnus elongatus is a common benthopelagic species within its known range, where it is likely to be restricted by lack of data, and faces no particular threats. For these reasons, the International Union for Conservation of Nature has assessed its conservation status as being of "least concern".

References

Sternoptychidae
Fish described in 1979